Óscar Diego Gestido Pose (Montevideo, Uruguay November 28, 1901 – Montevideo, December 6, 1967) was president of Uruguay in 1967.

Biography
Diego Gestido was from a military background, and served in the military for 36 years before retiring with the rank of general in 1957. Afterwards he had an important participation during the Uruguayan floods of April 1959, being considered a hero.

He was also a member of the Colorado Party.

President of Uruguay
On 27 November 1966 elections were celebrated, together with a constitutional referendum which gave place to a new Constitution restoring one-person presidency. Diego Gestido was elected President of Uruguay, a post he held from March 1, 1967, to December 6, 1967.

Prominent people in his government included Vice President of Uruguay Jorge Pacheco Areco, César Charlone, Luis Hierro Gambardella, Julio Lacarte Muró, Manuel Flores Mora, and Zelmar Michelini, who later co-founded the Frente Amplio grouping.

Death and succession
Diego Gestido died in office. His remains were buried at the Central Cemetery of Montevideo.

His death meant that three Uruguayan Presidents had died in office in a 20-year period.

He was succeeded by his vice president, Jorge Pacheco Areco.

Family
His brother Álvaro Gestido was a notable Uruguayan football player.

Honors
 Rivera International Airport is named after him.

See also
 Politics of Uruguay

References

1901 births
1967 deaths
People from Montevideo
Uruguayan people of Galician descent
Colorado Party (Uruguay) politicians
National Council of Government (Uruguay)
Presidents of Uruguay
Uruguayan Air Force generals
Burials at the Central Cemetery of Montevideo